The forest vine snake (Thelotornis kirtlandii), also known commonly as the twig snake and the bird snake (as are other members of the genus Thelotornis), is a species of venomous snake in the family Colubridae. The species is endemic to Africa.

Etymology
The specific name, kirtlandii, is in honor of American naturalist Jared Potter Kirtland.

Geographic range
T. kirtlandii is found in Sub-Saharan Africa, south to a latitude of about 17° S. It has been recorded from Angola, Benin, Cameroon, Central African Republic, Congo, DR Congo, Equatorial Guinea, Gabon, Ghana, Guinea, Guinea-Bissau, Ivory Coast, Kenya, Liberia, Nigeria, Sierra Leone, Somalia, Tanzania, Togo, Uganda, and Zambia.

Diet
T. kirtlandii is known to eat small birds.

Reproduction
T. kirtlandii is oviparous.

References

Further reading
 Hallowell E (1844). "Descriptions of new species of African Reptiles". Proc. Acad. Nat. Sci. Philadelphia 2: 58-62. (Leptophis kirtlandii, new species, p. 62).
 Spawls, Stephen; Howell, Kim; Hinkel, Harald; Menegon, Michele (2018). Field Guide to East African Reptiles, Second Edition. London: Bloomsbury Natural History. 624 pp. .

External links

 

Reptiles described in 1844
Reptiles of Africa
Colubrids